Zetex fabrics were invented by Bal Dixit in 1978. This highly texturized fiberglass fabric exhibits many of the same properties as asbestos, such as resistance to heat, corrosion and rot resistance, outstanding electrical properties, ability to withstand molten metal, and thermal insulation. However, it does not carry the same health risks.

Testing
Zetex has been tested against asbestos to prove it is a good replacement. Two Zetex filaments were created, one with a 9 um diameter (G) and a 6 um diameter (DE).

Physical Properties
Chrysotile, the most commonly encountered form of asbestos, has a density of 40 oz/yd2, while Zetex G has a density of 35 oz/yd2, and Zetex DE has a density of 32 oz/yd2. Other physical properties are listed in the table below:

Temperature rise testing
A glove was fabricated from this material to allow for further testing to be done. A thermocouple was used to test the inside temperature of the glove while holding a 600°F(316°C) pipe. A measure was taken to see how long it took the inside to reach 140°F. Both gloves included the same wool liner. Another test was done with a 1200°F(649°C) pipe.

Uses
Zetex can be used for a variety of fire protection applications.

Entertainment and theatres
Zetex has replaced asbestos as the material for the large fire curtains that lower and close off the stage opening in case of a fire in a proscenium type theatre or auditorium.

Construction
During welding, workers can wear Zetex-made fire suits for protection. Also, Zetex material can be used for fabric expansion joints, creating fire barriers in buildings.

Automotive
Zetex material can encapsulate gas tanks or exhaust pipes, protecting from fire caused by gas leaks.

Foundries/Welding
Zetex suits can be used in welding applications, protecting the worker from sparks and other molten objects. It can also be used to create a fire barrier.

Fire Safety
Fire departments can use Zetex made suits to battle fires due to Zetex's heat resistant properties. Full engulfment capabilities of the suit make for a good emergency combatant.

Glassblowing
When boxing a newly finished piece of glass for annealing a glassblower may utilize Zetex gloves to hold the finished piece in transition from the knock off table to the annealer.

References

External links 
 Newtex Industries

Technical fabrics